One Way Wahine is a 1965 American comedy film produced and directed by William O. Brown and starring Joy Harmon, Anthony Eisley, the former star of Hawaiian Eye and Edgar Bergen. Set in Hawaii, it was one of group of a Beach party films made during the decade.

Plot

Cast
 Joy Harmon as Kit Williams
 Anthony Eisley as Chick Lindell
 Adele Claire as Brandy Saveties
 David Whorf as Lou Talbot
 Edgar Bergen as Sweeney
 Lee Krieger as Charley Rossi
 Ken Mayer as Hugo Sokol
 Harold Fong as Quong
 Ralph Nanalei as Paulo
 Aime Luce as Tahitian Dancer
 Alvy Moore as Maxwell

References

Bibliography
 Thomas Lisanti. Hollywood Surf and Beach Movies: The First Wave, 1959–1969. McFarland, 2015.

External links
 

1965 films
1965 comedy films
American comedy films
American black-and-white films
1960s English-language films
1960s American films